Ask a Stupid Question Day is a holiday that is sometimes celebrated in the United States, usually by school students and teachers. Although Ask a Stupid Question Day's default date is September 28, in practice it is usually observed on the last school day of September.

Origin
This holiday was created by teachers in the 1980s to encourage students to ask more questions in the classroom. According to HolidayInsights.com, "at the time, there was a movement by teachers to try to get kids to ask more questions in the classroom. Kids sometimes hold back, fearing their question is stupid, and asking it will result in ridicule."

International
In 2009 The Daily Telegraph reported that the day was being celebrated in Britain. It has been reported as far afield as India, in The Hindu.

See also
 No such thing as a stupid question

References

Unofficial observances
September observances